Hazipur is a village in Alwar district, Rajasthan, India.

Villages in Alwar district